NGC 7507 is an elliptical galaxy located in the constellation Sculptor. It was discovered by the astronomer William Herschel on October 30, 1783.

References 

Sculptor (constellation)
7507
Elliptical galaxies